The Dabene Treasure was unearthed in 2004 near the village of Dabene in the municipality of Karlovo, Plovdiv Province, central Bulgaria. The excavations were led by the archaeologist Martin Hristov. Other elements of the treasure were discovered in 2006.

The excavations in the area began after two archaeologists from the National Historical Museum met a local woman with an exquisite golden necklace found by her husband while ploughing with his tractor. The couple was unaware of the origins of the jewel and cooperated with the archaeologists.

The whole treasure consists of 20,000 gold jewelerry items from 18 to 23 carats. The most important of them was a dagger made of gold and platinum with an unusual edge. The treasure was dated to the end of the 3rd millennium B.C. The scientists suggest that the Karlovo valley where Dabene is located used to be a major crafts center which exported golden jewelry all over Europe. That conclusion was made because the golden elements were not discovered in a burial mound and there are no remains of bones or ceramics and therefore the elements were not burial gifts.

The treasure was unearthed in perfect condition and was exhibited in the National Historical Museum without restoration on 9 August 2009.

References

External links 
Ovcharov, Nikolay. Treasure of Dabene Takes the World by Storm at Standart, 10 December 2005
Unique golden dagger unearthed in Bulgaria Southeast European Times, 9 August 2006
Gold treasure from Dabene. Ancient Civilization from 3rd millennium BC at ancient-treasure.info

2004 archaeological discoveries
Treasure troves in Bulgaria
History of Plovdiv Province
Gold objects
Jewellery
Ancient art in metal